The Church of Saint John the Baptist is a 15th-century Catholic church in Tomar, Portugal that was built by King Manuel I and is of Manueline architecture. As its name implies, the church is dedicated to Saint John the Baptist. It has been classified as a National Monument since 1910.

About 
The main church of Tomar is located in the main square of the town, in front of the Municipality (17th century) and a modern statue of Gualdim Pais. The church was built between the 15th and 16th centuries and has many interesting artistic details, like the flamboyant Gothic portal, the Manueline tower with a 16th-century clock, the decorated capitals of the inner columns of the nave and several panels painted in the 1530s by one of Portugal's best Renaissance artists, Gregório Lopes.

Gallery

References

External links
 Tomar, Cidade dos Templários: Igreja S. João Baptista (Portuguese)

Churches in Santarém District
National monuments in Santarém District
Manueline architecture
Buildings and structures in Tomar